The Great Hopewell Road is thought to connect the  Hopewell culture (100 BCE-500 CE) monumental earthwork centers located at Newark and Chillicothe, a distance of  through the heart of Ohio, United States. The Newark complex was built 2,000 to 1800 years ago.

They said that the road extended much farther south from Newark in the direction of Chillicothe. Other 19th-century investigators, such as Ephraim G. Squier and Edwin H. Davis, also documented the walls of the road near Newark. The 2.5-mile section from the Newark Octagon south to Ramp Creek is now known as the "Van Voorhis Walls".

In the 1930s, the area was surveyed by plane, revealing traces of the road extended for  toward the Hopewellian center of present-day Chillicothe. Additional examination of the area with the new sensing technology of LiDAR (Light Detection And Ranging) adds confirmation to this finding and suggests a way to gain more evidence. This technology showed the road was lower than the surrounding land, sunk between the walls.

Dr. Brad Lepper, the present-day champion of the Great Hopewell Road, claims that traces of the road remain at four additional places along the  line connecting Newark and Chillicothe. Parts of the road can be seen from the air and with infrared photography. There is precedent for such a sacred road at other complexes.  More "ground truthing" needs to be performed but the evidence is suggestive.

The first 2.5 mi south of the parallel-walled roadway of the Newark Earthworks is known as the Van Voorhis Walls. It is a confirmed earthwork.  This portion of the earthwork terminates a Ramp Creek, in Heath, Licking County, Ohio. South of there, the projected path of the Hopewell Road passes through fields toward Millersport, Licking County, Ohio. Evidence from early accounts and 1930s aerial photography suggests that the Hopewell Road may continue south of Ramp Creek, and a cultural resource management study provides equivocal, yet suggestive evidence of the earthwork south of Ramp Creek. In 2016, an analysis of previous studies found enough evidence of the Great Hopewell Road south of Ramp Creek, to indicate that archaeologists should continue to search for evidence of it.Great Hopewell Road_New_Data_Analyses_and_Future_Research_Prospects

References

External links 
  "Newark Earthworks, The Ancient Ohio Trail" -The Great Hopewell Road
  "The Great Hopewell Road: GIS Solutions Towards Pathway Discovery", The Newsletter of Hopewell Archaeology in the Ohio River Valley
 William F. Romain and Jarrod Burks, "LiDAR Imaging of the Great Hopewell Road", 4 February 2008, Ohio Archaeological Council	
 "Kevin R. Schwarz, Great Hopewell Road: New Data Analyses and Future Research Prospects. Journal of Ohio Archaeology 2016"

Ohio Hopewell
Native American trails in the United States
Historic trails and roads in Ohio
Native American history of Ohio